The African Origins project is a database run by researchers at Emory University, Georgia, United States, which aims to document all the known facts about the African diaspora, including all documentary material pertaining to the transatlantic slave trade. It is a sister project to Voyages: The Trans-Atlantic Slave Trade Database.

References

External links

African diaspora
Databases
African slave trade
European colonization of the Americas
European colonisation in Africa
Early modern period
Forced migration
History of sugar
Slave trade
History of the Caribbean
Slavery in North America
Slavery in South America
Slavery in the British Empire
Slavery in the United States
Trade routes